The following is a list of organizations for professionals involved in the practice of pharmacy. Such organizations are typically professional societies, as opposed to trade associations.

International
 International Pharmaceutical Federation (FIP)
 International Pharmaceutical Students' Federation (IPSF)

European
 European Association of Employed Community Pharmacists in Europe (EPhEU)
 Pharmaceutical Group of the European Union (PGEU)

Australia
 Australian College of Pharmacy
 Pharmaceutical Society of Australia
 The Pharmacy Guild of Australia
 The Society of Hospital Pharmacists of Australia

Canada
 Canadian Pharmacists Association
 Canadian Society of Hospital Pharmacists
Ontario Pharmacists Association

China
 Chinese Pharmaceutical Association

Denmark
 Danish Association of Pharmaconomists

Ireland
 Pharmaceutical Society of Ireland

Israel
 The Pharmaceutical Association of Israel

Mauritius
 Pharmaceutical Association of Mauritius

New Zealand
 Pharmaceutical Society Of New Zealand

Norway
 Norwegian Pharmacy Association

Pakistan
 Pakistan Pharmacists Association

Portugal
Portuguese Pharmaceutical Industry Association

United Kingdom
 National Pharmacy Association
 Pharmaceutical Society of Northern Ireland
 Royal Pharmaceutical Society (RPS)

United States
 American Association of Colleges of Pharmacy  (AACP)
 American Pharmacists Association  (APhA)
 American Society for Pharmacy Law
 American Society of Consultant Pharmacists (ASCP)
 American Society of Health-System Pharmacists  (ASHP)
 Professional Compounding Centers of America
 American College of Clinical Pharmacy (ACCP)
 College of Psychiatric and Neurologic Pharmacists (CPNP)

Ghana
 Pharmaceutical Society of Ghana (PSG)

See also
 History of pharmacy
 International Pharmaceutical Federation
 List of pharmacy schools
 List of pharmacy organizations in the United Kingdom

References

Pharmacy associations
Pharmacy associations
 
 
Associations
Pharmacy